Richland School District is a school district located in Richland Center, Wisconsin.

Schools
 Jefferson Elementary (1st To 5th grade)
 Doudna Elementary (Kindergarten to 5th grade)
 Lincoln School (4K & Kindergarten)
 Richland Center Middle School
 Richland Center High School

Comprehensive Learning Center at Lincoln (alternative secondary school)

References

External links
Official Website
Richland School District Foundation

School districts in Wisconsin
Education in Richland County, Wisconsin